The 2008 Miami Dolphins season was the franchise's 39th season in the National Football League, the 43rd overall and the first under new head coach Tony Sparano.  During the regular season the Dolphins completed the greatest single-season turnaround in NFL history, going from a 1–15 regular season record in 2007 to an 11–5 record in 2008. The previous record for most improved team one year after a 1–15 season belonged to the 1997 New York Jets, who went 9–7.  The 1999 Indianapolis Colts were the only other team to accomplish a 10-game turnaround, winning 13 games after winning 3 in 1998, which was also the first year of the Peyton Manning era. Additionally, Miami won the AFC East, becoming the first team in NFL history to win their division after only having one win the previous season. The division title also snapped the Patriots' 5-year streak of winning the AFC East. Their season would come to an end in the Wild Card round when they were defeated by the Baltimore Ravens, which coincidentally, was also the only team they beat last season in overtime to save the Dolphins from suffering a winless season. With their 11–5 record and division title, the Dolphins had hopes of achieving their first playoff victory since 2000, or to possibly become the first team ever to make the Super Bowl after winning only one game the previous season, similar to how the Carolina Panthers went 1–15 in 2001 and made Super Bowl XXXVIII just two seasons later.

The 2008 season was the first with Bill Parcells as Executive Vice President of Football Operations, Jeff Ireland as General Manager, and Tony Sparano as head coach.

With a league-worst 1–15 record in 2007, the Dolphins held the first pick in the 2008 NFL Draft and selected Michigan offensive tackle Jake Long. The offseason also saw the departure of two Pro Bowlers and long-time Dolphins with the release of linebacker Zach Thomas and trade of defensive end Jason Taylor.

The 2008 season was the last season in which the Miami Dolphins had a winning record and qualified for the playoffs before the 2016 team accomplished the feat.

This season was also notable for the Dolphins wide-spread use of the Wildcat offense. Though previously used by other teams in several other seasons, this package was fully installed by the Dolphins by week 3, and led to an upset win over the defending AFC Champion New England Patriots. Until 2019, this was the Dolphins' last road win over the Patriots. Additionally, this was the last season that the AFC East was won by a team other than the Patriots, up until it came time for the 2020 season, when the Bills snapped the Patriots' streak of 11 AFC Eastern crowns with a 13–3 record.

Offseason personnel moves

Front office
On December 27, 2007, Dolphins owner Wayne Huizenga hired former NFL head coach and ESPN analyst Bill Parcells as Executive Vice President of Football Operations. Parcells signed a four-year deal with the Dolphins less than a day after turning down a similar offer from the Atlanta Falcons.

Just a few days after Parcells' hiring, three men were dismissed from the Dolphins' front office. The most notable of which was general manager Randy Mueller, who was hired by the team in 2005. Also dismissed were Assistant Director of Player Personnel Mike Baugh and College Scouting Coordinator Rick Thompson.

Three days after Mueller's dismissal, Parcells hired Jeff Ireland as the team's new general manager. Ireland had worked for the Dallas Cowboys the past seven years, including the last three as Vice President of College and Pro Scouting. Ireland had worked with Parcells previously, when the latter was head coach of the Cowboys from 2003 to 2006. Although Ireland was officially given final say on personnel decisions, it was speculated that Parcells was actually in control, and did not hold the title of General Manager so that the team may hire a front office executive from another team.

On January 15, the Dolphins reeled in another former Cowboys executive when they hired Brian Gaine as Assistant Director of Player Personnel. Gaine had previously spent the past three seasons as the Cowboys' Assistant Director of Pro Scouting, working with both Parcells and Ireland during that time.

Following the 2008 NFL Draft, it was reported on May 1 that the Dolphins had fired scouts Ellis Rainsberger, Jack Glowik and Roger Pollard. The team's vice president of media relations, Harvey Greene, said Rainsberger had retired and did not comment on the other two reported firings.

Coaches

Head coach
Just one day after hiring of Jeff Ireland as general manager, the Dolphins fired head coach Cam Cameron after just one season on the job. Cameron led the Dolphins to an NFL worst 1–15 record in 2007, which was also the worst in franchise history. Additionally, all but two members of the coaching staff were dismissed. The only coaches retained were assistant special teams coach Steve Hoffman and linebackers coach George Edwards. Both Hoffman and Edwards were coaches for the Dallas Cowboys during Ireland's tenure with the team.

A search for Cameron's replacement began almost immediately after his firing. Various candidates were rumored, many of which had some connection to Parcells and/or Ireland. Rumored candidates included Cleveland Browns head coach Romeo Crennel, Dallas Cowboys assistant Tony Sparano, Cowboys secondary coach Todd Bowles, Arizona Cardinals running backs coach Maurice Carthon and Cardinals offensive coordinator Todd Haley. Additionally, Baltimore Ravens defensive coordinator Rex Ryan and Minnesota Vikings defensive coordinator Leslie Frazier were contacted. The Washington Post suggested that Washington Redskins defensive coordinator Gregg Williams could be a candidate as well.

The first interview scheduled was Sparano, who met with the Dolphins on Saturday, January 11. Sparano had previously met with the Atlanta Falcons and Baltimore Ravens regarding their head coaching vacancies. On January 6, it was reported that Sparano would be offered the Dolphins' head coaching job, and that he would accept. The Dolphins denied the report later that day, saying it was an initial interview only and that the team had interviews with others planned over the next few days. However, the addition of quarterbacks coach David Lee, a former Cowboys assistant, fueled speculation that Sparano was indeed going to the next head coach of the Miami Dolphins.

The team then proceeded to interview Frazier, Ryan and Tennessee Titans defensive coordinator Jim Schwartz. After the Dallas Cowboys lost to the New York Giants in the divisional round of the 2007 NFL playoffs on January 13, speculation grew that Sparano's hiring was imminent. On January 16, the Dolphins ended their search by naming Sparano the eighth head coach in franchise history. He received a four-year contract believed to be worth between $2.5 and $2.7 million per season.

Assistants
Parcells and Ireland made their first coaching staff addition on January 7, luring Ole Miss offensive coordinator David Lee to be quarterbacks coach. Lee, who briefly followed Houston Nutt to Ole Miss after serving as his offensive coordinator at Arkansas in 2007, worked with Parcells and Ireland as the Cowboys' quarterbacks coach from 2003 to 2006. The addition fueled speculation that Sparano was indeed going to the next head coach of the Miami Dolphins.

Two days after hiring Sparano as their head coach, the Dolphins made their second assistant coach hiring. On January 18, Mike Maser was named the team's new offensive line coach. Maser had previously served in the same capacity for the Carolina Panthers from 2003 to 2006, and worked with Sparano when both were assistants for the Jacksonville Jaguars in 2002.

Over the next week, the Dolphins filled various positions on Sparano's staff. On January 22, former Kansas City Chiefs running backs coach James Saxon was hired in the same capacity for the Dolphins. Also hired that day was former Atlanta Falcons strength and conditioning coach Evan Marcus, who took the same job with Miami.

On January 23, the Dolphins added four more assistant coaches to their staff when they named Paul Pasqualoni as their defensive coordinator, Todd Bowles as assistant head coach/secondary, Kacy Rodgers as defensive line coach and David Corrao as defensive quality control coach. Pasqualoni, Bowles and Rodgers all came from the Dallas Cowboys' staff, while Corrao was most recently linebackers coach at the University of Mississippi.

A day later, former UCLA head coach Karl Dorrell was named the team's new wide receivers coach. Five more coaches were added to the staff on January 28 when the Dolphins named John Bonamego as their special teams coordinator, George DeLeone as their tight ends coach, David Puloka as assistant strength and conditioning coach, Jim Reid as outside linebackers coach and Steve Bush as offensive quality control coach.

The Dolphins made their final addition to the staff on February 4, hiring Dan Henning as offensive coordinator. Henning, who had most recently served as offensive coordinator for the Carolina Panthers from 2002 to 2006, had previous worked for the Dolphins under Don Shula as quarterbacks and wide receivers coach in 1979–1980.

Staff
When the Dolphins' coaching staff was completed with the hiring of offensive coordinator Dan Henning on February 14, only two of the 17 assistant coaches under Sparano (Edwards and Hoffman) were holdovers from the previous season's staff. Three of the new coaches (Bowles, Pasqualoni and Rodgers) had experience with Parcells, Ireland and Sparano in Dallas. The completed staff was as follows:

Roster Moves

Departures 
 February 11 – Terminated the contracts of quarterback Trent Green, wide receiver Marty Booker, offensive tackle L. J. Shelton and defensive tackle Keith Traylor.
 February 11 – Waived offensive tackle Anthony Alabi, offensive tackle Marion Dukes, guard Marquay Love, offensive lineman Joe Toledo and defensive tackle Anthony Bryant.
 February 14 – Released linebacker Zach Thomas.
 April 24 – Released the following seven players: quarterback Casey Bramlet, linebacker Marcello Church, safety Tuff Harris, cornerback Jereme Perry, wide receiver Kerry Reed, linebacker Mark Washington and wide receiver Chandler Williams. The team also waived safety Cameron Worrell, who tore his ACL in 2007, after he failed a physical.
 April 29 – Released quarterback Matt Baker and defensive tackle Steve Fifita.
 May 5 – Waived wide receiver Marcel Reece, defensive end Derreck Robinson, linebacker Abraham Wright and cornerback Aaron Lane. Reece and Lane were signed as undrafted free agents the previous week, while Robinson and Wright were with the Dolphins in 2007.
 May 16 – Waived offensive lineman Drew Mormino after he failed a physical. Mormino spent the 2007 season on injured reserve with a shoulder injury.
 June 6 – Released placekicker Dave Rayner.

Re-signings 
 January 7 – Re-signed wide receivers Kerry Reed and Chandler Williams, guard Marquay Love and linebacker Marcello Church. All finished the 2007 season on the Dolphins' practice squad.
 March 3 – Re-signed safety Yeremiah Bell to a one-year, $1.4 million contract.
 March 5 – Re-signed cornerback Michael Lehan to a three-year, $4.95 million contract.

Signings 
 January 30 – Signed quarterback Matt Baker, offensive lineman Trey Darilek and linebacker Junior Glymph. Baker was with the Dallas Cowboys in 2006, while Darilek and Glymph were both in training camp with Dallas in 2007.
 February 8 – Signed cornerback Joey Thomas. He was originally drafted by the Green Bay Packers in the third round of the 2004 NFL Draft and had most recently spent training camp with the Cowboys in 2007.
 February 28 – Signed wide receiver David Kircus, formerly of the Denver Broncos and Detroit Lions.
 February 29 – Signed tight end Sean Ryan (Jets) to a one-year deal.
 February 29 – Signed wide receiver Ernest Wilford (Jaguars) to a four-year, $13 million contract with $6 million guaranteed.
 March 1 – Signed linebacker Charlie Anderson (Texans) to a three-year contract.
 March 1 – Signed quarterback Josh McCown (Raiders) to a two-year, $6.25 million contract.
 March 1 – Signed guard Justin Smiley (49ers) to a five-year, $25 million contract with $9 million guaranteed.
 March 1 – Signed defensive end Randy Starks (Titans) to a five-year, $21 million contract with $7 million guaranteed.
 March 1 – Signed linebacker Reggie Torbor (Giants) to a four-contract.
 March 5 – Signed fullback Boomer Grigsby (Chiefs) to a one-year contract.
 March 11 – Signed safety Keith Davis (Cowboys) to a two-year contract.
 March 12 – Signed placekicker Dave Rayner (Chargers) to a one-year contract.
 March 14 – Signed cornerback Nathan Jones (Cowboys) to a two-year contract.
 March 16 – Signed wide receiver Tab Perry (Bengals) to a one-year contract.
 March 28 – Signed safety Chris Crocker (Falcons) to a one-year, $1.15 million contract with a $300,000 signing bonus.
 April 14 – Signed safety Will Billingsley (North Carolina A&T) as a street free agent. Billingsley was eligible for the 2007 NFL Draft but was not drafted and remained unsigned throughout the year.
 May 19 – Signed offensive lineman Steve McKinney (Texans) to a one-year contract.

Trades 
 February 29 – Acquired defensive tackle Jason Ferguson from the Dallas Cowboys for a sixth-round pick in the 2009 NFL Draft. The teams also swapped sixth-round picks in the 2008 NFL Draft.
 April 26 – Acquired linebacker Akin Ayodele and tight end Anthony Fasano from the Dallas Cowboys in exchange for the team's fourth-round pick (100th overall) in the 2008 NFL Draft. The pick was later traded to the Oakland Raiders and used to select cornerback Tyvon Branch.
 July 21 – Traded defensive end Jason Taylor to the Washington Redskins in exchange for a second-round pick in 2009 and a sixth-round pick in 2010.

Free agency 
The Dolphins entered free agency $44 million under that year's $116 million salary cap – the highest in the league at the time. The team cleared between $13–15 million by cutting players leading up to free agency.

Free agents 
UFA: Unrestricted free agent, RFA: Restricted free agent, ERFA: Exclusive-rights free agent

2008 NFL draft 

Due to their league-worst 1–15 record in 2007, the Dolphins secured the first overall pick in the 2008 NFL Draft on April 26. The Dolphins used it to draft Michigan offensive tackle Jake Long.

Including Long, the Dolphins selected the following nine players in the 2008 NFL Draft:

Notes
 The Dolphins own second-round pick, the first of the round, was the 32nd overall in the draft rather than the 33rd because the New England Patriots forfeited their first-round pick (31st overall) after the Spygate incident.
 The Dolphins acquired a second-round pick from the San Diego Chargers in a trade that sent wide receiver Chris Chambers to San Diego on October 16, 2007.
 The Dolphins sent their fifth-round pick to the Kansas City Chiefs in exchange for quarterback Trent Green on June 5, 2007.
 The Dolphins and Dallas Cowboys swapped sixth-round draft picks in trade that brought defensive tackle Jason Ferguson to Miami.
 The last of the Dolphins' picks in the sixth and seventh rounds were awarded by NFL due to free agents lost the previous offseason.

Draft day trades 
On the first day of the draft, the Dolphins traded second-year running back Lorenzo Booker to the Philadelphia Eagles in exchange for a fourth-round pick (115th overall) in the 2008 NFL Draft.

On the second day of the draft, the Dolphins acquired the Detroit Lions' third-round pick (66th overall) as well as their sixth-round pick (176th overall) in exchange for the Dolphins' third-round pick (64th overall). The Lions used the pick to select running back Kevin Smith, while the Dolphins took defensive end Kendall Langford with the third-round pick and running back Jalen Parmele with the sixth-rounder.

Later on Day 2, the Dolphins traded the fourth-round pick acquired from the Eagles, along with a seventh-round pick (208th overall), to the Chicago Bears in exchange for the 110th overall selection. The Dolphins used this pick to select guard Shawn Murphy. The 115th overall pick was eventually dealt by the Bears the Tampa Bay Buccaneers, who used it to select defensive tackle Dre Moore. The Bears used the seventh-round pick to select defensive end Ervin Baldwin.

Draft pick signings 
In the weeks leading up to the draft, the Dolphins began contract negotiations with Jake Long. On April 14, Peter King of Sports Illustrated reported that the Dolphins had given Long a deadline to accept their contract offer (believed to be worth less than 2007 No. 1 pick JaMarcus Russell received from the Oakland Raiders); otherwise, they would move on to another prospect. On April 22, the Dolphins officially signed Long to a five-year, $57.75 million contract with $30 million guaranteed, assuring they would take him first overall. On May 19, the Dolphins signed sixth-rounders Jalen Parmele and Lex Hilliard and seventh-rounder Lionel Dotson to contacts. On May 23, sixth-round pick Donald Thomas was signed to a multi-year deal. On July 11, the Dolphins signed third-round pick Kendall Langford to a multi-year deal.

Undrafted free agents 
Following the 2008 NFL Draft, the Dolphins signed 18 undrafted free agents. They were:

Two failed to survive a week with the team, as the Dolphins released Lane and Reece on May 5. Less than a month after being signed, Robertson decided to retire. On June 9, the Dolphins signed wide receiver John Dunlap (NC State) after he attended a minicamp on a tryout basis.

Reserve lists 
 May 27 – Placed defensive tackle Kory Robertson on the reserve/retired list.
 May 29 – Placed wide receiver Tab Perry on injured reserve with a torn Achilles tendon.

Roster

Opening camp roster

Final preseason roster

Roster moves

July
 25 – Signed second-round pick defensive end Phillip Merling.
 25 – Waived wide receiver Justin Wynn.
 25 – Signed wide receiver Anthony Armstrong (Desperados).
 26 – Placed linebacker Joey Porter on the Active/non-football injury list and cornerback Michael Lehan on the Active/PUP list.
 26 – Waived offensive tackles Dan Gore and Julius Wilson.
 28 – Activated linebacker Joey Porter (NFI).
 28 – Signed second-round pick quarterback Chad Henne.
 28 – Signed guard Rueben Riley (Panthers).
 30 – Waived cornerback Scorpio Babers.
 30 – Signed cornerback Chris Roberson (Jaguars).

August
 2 – Waived/injured tight end Aaron Halterman and waived guard Rueben Riley.
 4 – Placed tight end Aaron Halterman on injured reserve.
 11 – Waived/injured linebacker Kelvin Smith.
 11 – Signed quarterback Chad Pennington (Jets) and linebacker Maurice Fountain (Blaze)
 August 12 – Released placekicker Jay Feely.
 August 12 – Placed linebacker Kelvin Smith on injured reserve.
 August 15 – Waived linebacker Keith Saunders and wide receivers John Dunlap and Selwyn Lymon.
 August 18 – Released offensive lineman Steve McKinney.
 August 18 – Activated cornerback Michael Lehan (PUP).
 August 20 – Traded cornerback Travis Daniels to the Cleveland Browns in exchange for a seventh-round draft pick in the 2009 NFL Draft.
 August 22 – Waived wide receiver David Kircus and cornerback Chris Roberson.
 August 25 – Signed undrafted free agent offensive tackle Pedro Sosa (Rutgers).
 August 27 – Released safety Keith Davis.
 August 30 – Traded quarterback Josh McCown to the Carolina Panthers in exchange for a seventh-round pick in the 2009 NFL Draft.

Final cuts
On August 30, the Dolphins made 17 roster moves to reach the NFL's 53-player limit. The players released were:

Preseason schedule
The Dolphins' 2008 preseason schedule was announced on April 3.

Preseason recap
After losing their preseason opener to the Tampa Bay Buccaneers, the Dolphins won their final three contests to finish the preseason 3–1.

Quarterback Chad Pennington was the Dolphins' most efficient passer of the preseason, leading the team in completion percentage (72.0) and passer rating (104.8). Rookie quarterback Chad Henne led the team in passing yards (351) but also in interceptions (2) while matching Pennington in passing touchdowns (1).

Running backs Ricky Williams and Jalen Parmele tied for the team lead in rushing yards at 123. Williams, Parmele and Ronnie Brown were the only Dolphins to rush for a touchdown during the preseason, scoring one each. Lex Hilliard and Patrick Cobbs finished fourth and fifth, respectively, on the team in rushing yards.

No Dolphins player surpassed 100 receiving yards during the preseason, though wide receiver Ted Ginn Jr. came closest at 97. He also tied rookie Davone Bess for the team lead in receptions with eight. Tight ends Anthony Fasano and Sean Ryan were the only Dolphins to catch a touchdown pass.

On special teams, rookie placekicker Dan Carpenter converted 7-of-8 field-goal attempts and all six extra-point attempts. Punter Brandon Fields punted 21 times for a 44.1-yard average and two touchbacks. Meanwhile, Davone Bess led the team in punt returns (6) but Ted Ginn Jr. was the only Dolphins player to return a kick or punt for a touchdown. Patrick Cobbs led the team in kick return yards with 106.

On defense, Linebackers Akin Ayodele and Reggie Torbor tied for the team lead with 17 tackles, while Ayodele led the team in solo stops with 12. Five others – Yeremiah Bell, Channing Crowder, Renaldo Hill, Nathan Jones, Edmond Miles – also reached double-digits in tackles.

Four players – Jason Allen, Renaldo Hill, Michael Lehan, Joey Thomas – recorded an interception during the preseason. The Dolphins also totaled 14 quarterbacks sacks during the preseason. Linebacker Rob Ninkovich and defensive end Randy Starks each record a team-high two sacks, while ten other players each recorded a sack apiece. Channing Crowder, Junior Glymph and Paul Soliai each forced a fumble during the preseason.

Regular season

Schedule
The Dolphins' 2008 regular season schedule was released on April 15, 2008.

Note: Intra-division opponents are in bold text.

Standings

Opening day roster

Final roster

Game summaries

Week 1: vs. New York Jets

With the loss, the Dolphins began their season 0–1.

Week 2: at Arizona Cardinals

With the loss, the Dolphins fell to 0–2 and have lost their 5th straight game to NFC Opponents.

Week 3: at New England Patriots

The Dolphins headed to Foxboro to face the Division rival New England Patriots. Little did New England know that they would be a test for an offensive formation concocted as the Dolphins coaching staff wanted to put running backs Ricky Williams and Ronnie Brown onto the field at the same time.  David Lee thus revealed the Wildcat to the NFL. Ronnie Brown would take direct snaps and keep it himself or hand it of to another back.  The Dolphins decimated the Patriots all day with the Wildcat offense for a 38–13 victory as they put a dent in the Patriots' 21-game regular season winning streak and went on their bye week at 1–2. This was the last time the Dolphins beat the Patriots on the road until 2019.

Week 5: vs. San Diego Chargers

With the win, the Dolphins improved to 2–2.

Week 6: at Houston Texans

With the loss, the Dolphins fell to 2–3.

Week 7: vs. Baltimore Ravens

With the loss, the Dolphins fell to 2–4.

Week 8: vs. Buffalo Bills

With the win, the Dolphins improved to 3–4.

Week 9: at Denver Broncos

With the win, the Dolphins improved to 4–4.

Week 10: vs. Seattle Seahawks

With the win, the Dolphins improved to 5–4 and snapped their 5-game losing streak to NFC Opponents.

Week 11: vs. Oakland Raiders

With the win, the Dolphins improved to 6–4.

Week 12: vs. New England Patriots
{{Americanfootballbox
|titlestyle=;text-align:center;
|state=autocollapse
|title=Week Twelve: New England Patriots at Miami Dolphins
|Road=Patriots
|R1=3||R2=14||R3=14||R4=17
|Home=Dolphins
|H1=7||H2=7||H3=7||H4=7
|stadium= Dolphin Stadium, Miami Gardens, Florida
|date=November 23
|time= 1:00 p.m. EST
|weather= , partly cloudy
|TV=CBS |TVAnnouncers= Greg Gumbel (play-by-play) and Dan Dierdorf (color commentator)
|referee= Alberto Riveron
|attendance= 67,176
|scoring=
First quarter
NE – Stephen Gostkowski 30-yard field goal, 10:08. Patriots 3–0. Drive: 8 plays, 48 yards, 4:52.
MIA – Greg Camarillo 3-yard pass from Chad Pennington (Dan Carpenter kick), 5:23. Dolphins 7–3. Drive: 4 plays, 33 yards, 1:48.''Second quarterNE – Matt Cassel 8-yard run (Stephen Gostkowski kick), 14:54. Patriots 10–7. Drive: 12 plays, 74 yards, 5:29.
MIA – Chad Pennington 7-yard run (Dan Carpenter kick), 5:05. Dolphins 14–10. Drive: 12 plays, 72 yards, 7:12.
NE – Randy Moss 25-yard pass from Matt Cassel (Stephen Gostkowski kick), 2:14. Patriots 17–14. Drive: 6 plays, 63 yards, 2:51.Third quarterMIA – Casey Cramer 2-yard pass from Chad Pennington (Dan Carpenter kick), 11:28. Dolphins 21–17. Drive: 7 plays, 82 yards, 3:32.
NE – Randy Moss 8-yard pass from Matt Cassel (Stephen Gostkowski kick), 6:12. Patriots 24–21. Drive: 11 plays, 78 yards, 5:16.
NE – Kevin Faulk 21-yard run (Stephen Gostkowski kick), 0:00. Patriots 31–21. Drive: 4 plays, 87 yards, 1:30.Fourth quarterMIA – Ricky Williams 13-yard pass from Chad Pennington (Dan Carpenter kick), 13:11. Patriots 31–28. Drive: 5 plays, 69 yards, 1:49.
NE – Randy Moss 29-yard pass from Matt Cassel (Stephen Gostkowski kick), 8:52. Patriots 38–28. Drive: 9 plays, 80 yards, 4:19.
NE – Stephen Gostkowski 30-yard field goal, 7:08. Patriots 41–28. Drive: 4 plays, 5 yards, 1:27.
NE – BenJarvus Green-Ellis 1-yard run (Stephen Gostkowski kick), 0:37. Patriots 48–28. Drive: 7 plays, 40 yards, 3:27.
|stats=Top passersNE – Matt Cassel – 30/43, 415 yards, 3 TD, INT
MIA – Chad Pennington – 24/41, 341 yards, 3 TD, INTTop rushersNE – Kevin Faulk – 8 rushes, 53 yards, TD
MIA – Ronnie Brown – 10 rushes, 37 yardsTop receiversNE – Randy Moss – 8 receptions, 125 yards, 3 TD
MIA – Ted Ginn Jr. – 5 receptions, 88 yards
}}

A week after a 400-yard passing game against the Jets, Matt Cassel threw for 415 yards and three touchdowns for New England, while Chad Pennington threw for 345 yards and two scores; both quarterbacks also ran in a touchdown.  The Dolphins Wildcat offense was limited to 27 yards as the Patriots broke open a tight game in the fourth quarter, winning 48–28.

With the loss, the Dolphins dropped to 6–5.

Week 13: at St. Louis Rams

With the win, the Dolphins improved to 7–5.

Week 14: at Buffalo Bills

With the win, the Dolphins sweep the Bills for the season and improve their record to 8–5.

Week 15: vs. San Francisco 49ers

With the win, the Dolphins improved to 9–5 and finished 3–1 against the NFC West.

Week 16: at Kansas City Chiefs

With the win, the Dolphins improved to 10–5.

Week 17: at New York Jets

The Dolphins clinched the AFC East title as they intercepted Jets quarterback Brett Favre three times (Philip Merling ran in a 25-yard touchdown on a Favre pick) while Charlie Anderson and Patrick Cobbs blocked a Jets punt.   The win put the Dolphins into the playoffs for the first time since 2001 as they finished the season with an 11–5 record and locked up the AFC's No. 3 seed.

Transactions

August
 31 – Signed running back Ricky Williams to a one-year contract extension through the 2009 season.
 31 – Waived wide receiver Anthony Armstrong, offensive lineman Trey Darilek and linebacker Rob Ninkovich.
 31 – Claimed offensive lineman Andy Alleman (Saints), offensive tackle Nate Garner (Jets) and wide receiver Brandon London (Giants) off waivers.

September
 1 – Signed cornerback Will Billingsley, wide receiver Jayson Foster, offensive tackle Daren Heerspink, running back Lex Hilliard, tight end Matthew Mulligan and linebacker Tyson Smith (Cowboys) to the practice squad.
 2 – Released cornerback Joey Thomas.
 2 – Signed safety Tyrone Culver (Packer).
 2 – Released wide receiver Jayson Foster from the practice squad.
 2 – Re-signed wide receiver Anthony Armstrong, linebacker Rob Ninkovich and defensive tackle Anthony Toribio to the practice squad.
 9 – Released fullback Boomer Grigsby.
 9 – Signed fullback Casey Cramer (Titans).
 9 – Placed guard Donald Thomas on injured reserve.
 9 – Signed guard Evan Mathis (Panther).
 11 – Released tight end Sean Ryan.
 11 – Claimed offensive tackle Kirk Barton (Bears) off waivers.
 12 – Released offensive tackle Daren Heerspink from the practice squad.
 12 – Signed tight end Drew Atchison (Cowboys) to the practice squad.
 23 – Waived running back Jalen Parmele.
 23 – Released tight end Drew Atchison from the practice squad.
 23 – Signed guard Matt McChesney (Jets) to the practice squad.
 24 – Signed tight end Joey Haynos off the practice squad of the Green Bay Packers.
 25 – Released cornerback Will Billingsley from the practice squad.
 25 – Re-signed running back Jalen Parmele to the practice squad.

October
 4 – Released defensive tackle Anthony Toribio from the practice squad.
 4 – Re-signed cornerback Will Billingsley to the practice squad.
 6 – Released linebacker Tyson Smith from the practice squad.
 6 – Signed linebacker Marc Magro (Rams) to the practice squad.
 8 – Released cornerback Will Billingsley from the practice squad.
 8 – Re-signed defensive tackle Anthony Toribio to the practice squad.
 11 – Released defensive tackle Anthony Toribio from the practice squad.
 11 – Re-signed cornerback Will Billingsley to the practice squad.
 14 – Released safety Tyrone Culver.
 14 – Released linebacker Marc Magro from the practice squad.
 14 – Signed linebacker William Kershaw (Saints) to the practice squad.
 15 – Waived offensive tackle Kirk Barton.
 15 – Signed safety Brannon Condren (Rams).
 15 – Signed fullback Lousaka Polite (Bears).
 18 – Suspended defensive tackle Paul Soliai for one game.
 18 – Released cornerback Will Billingsley from the practice squad.
 18 – Re-signed defensive tackle Anthony Toribio to the practice squad.
 20 – Lifted suspension of defensive tackle Paul Soliai.
 21 – Released safety Chris Crocker.
 21 – Re-signed safety Tyrone Culver.
 24 – Placed cornerback Michael Lehan on injured reserve.
 24 – Re-signed cornerback Joey Thomas.

November
 4 – Waived wide receiver Derek Hagan.
 4 – Released tight end Matthew Mulligan from the practice squad.
 4 – Re-signed cornerback Will Billingsley to the practice squad.
 5 – Signed offensive tackle Brandon Frye off the practice squad of the Houston Texans.
 7 – Waived guard Evan Mathis.
 7 – Signed guard Matt McChesney from the practice squad to the active roster.
 10 – Waived safety Brannon Condren.
 10 – Re-signed safety Courtney Bryan.
 10 – Signed wide receiver Todd Lowber (Cowboys) to the practice squad.
 11 – Released defensive tackle Anthony Toribio from the practice squad.
 11 – Signed offensive tackle Kirk Barton (49ers) to the practice squad.
 15 – Placed guard Matt McChesney on injured reserve.
 15 – Signed linebacker Rob Ninkovich from the practice squad to the active roster.
 18 – Signed defensive tackle Joe Cohen (49ers) to the practice squad.
 19 – Waived linebacker Rob Ninkovich.
 19 – Claimed linebacker Erik Walden (Chiefs) off waivers.
 21 – Released cornerback Will Billingsley from the practice squad.
 21 – Re-signed linebacker Rob Ninkovich to the practice squad.
 24 – Placed wide receiver Greg Camarillo on injured reserve.
 28 – Practice squad offensive tackle Kirk Barton signed by the Cincinnati Bengals.
 29 – Signed center Al Johnson (Cardinals).
 29 – Re-signed cornerback Will Billingsley to the practice squad.

December
 2 – Placed guard Justin Smiley on injured reserve.
 3 – Claimed wide receiver Chris Hannon off waivers from the San Francisco 49ers.
 3 – Practice squad linebacker Rob Ninkovich signed by the New Orleans Saints.
 9 – Re-signed offensive tackle Daren Heerspink to the practice squad.
 10 – Practice Squad running back Jalen Parmele signed by the Baltimore Ravens.
 10 – Signed fullback Chris Brown to the practice squad.
 10 – Waived cornerback Michael Lehan from injured reserve.
 20 – Waived fullback Casey Cramer.
 20 – Signed linebacker William Kershaw from the practice squad to the active roster.
 22 – Waived wide receiver Chris Hannon.
 22 – Signed linebacker Derek Smith (Chargers).
 24''' – Re-signed cornerback Scorpio Babers to the practice squad.

Awards and honors

Coaches
After leading the Dolphins to an 11–5 record and an AFC East title in his first year as head coach, Tony Sparano was selected as the NFL Alumni's 2008 Coach of the Year. Sparano was also one of six nominees for the 2008 Motorola NFL Coach of the Year Award.

Players
The Dolphins landed two players – running back Ronnie Brown and linebacker Joey Porter – on the AFC's Pro Bowl team. Porter recorded 17.5 sacks during the 2008 season and was named as a starter on the AFC's squad. In his first career Pro Bowl season, Brown led the Dolphins with 214 carries, 916 rushing yards and 10 rushing touchdowns. He also ranked fourth on the team with 33 catches and sixth with 254 receiving yards.

Additionally, Porter was nominated for the GMC Sierra Defensive Player of the Year Award and was a second-team AP All-Pro selection. Quarterback Chad Pennington, guard Justin Smiley and cornerback Will Allen also received votes for the All-Pro team but were not selected.

However, Pennington did earn the NFL Comeback Player of the Year Award for the second time in his career. Pennington led the NFL with a 67.4 completion percentage and was second in the NFL with a 97.4 passer rating. He threw for a career-high 3,653 yards, 19 touchdowns and just seven interceptions.

In January 2009, three Dolphins rookies were selected to the Pro Football Writers Association's All-Rookie Team. Earning selections were offensive tackle Jake Long, defensive end Kendall Langford and placekicker Dan Carpenter.

The first overall pick in the 2008 NFL Draft, Long started all 16 games for the Dolphins at left tackle. A third-round pick out of Hampton, Langford started 14 of the 16 games in which he played as a rookie and recorded 31 tackles and two sacks. Undrafted out of Montana, Carpenter went 21-for-25 (84 percent) on field goals and made all 40 extra-point attempts.

Playoffs

Game summaries

AFC Wild Card: vs. Baltimore Ravens

Entering the postseason as the AFC's No. 3 seed, the Dolphins began their playoff run at home in the AFC Wild Card Round, with a Week 7 rematch against the No. 6 Baltimore Ravens.  Miami would deliver the game's first points with rookie kicker Dan Carpenter's 19-yard field goal.  The Ravens would later respond with a 23-yard field goal from kicker Matt Stover.  Baltimore would take the lead with safety Ed Reed returning a Chad Pennington interception 64 yards for a touchdown.  The Ravens would then close out the half with Stover's 31-yard field goal.

Baltimore would increase their lead in the third quarter with running back Le'Ron McClain's 8-yard touchdown run.  The Dolphins tried to come back in the fourth quarter as Pennington completed a 2-yard touchdown pass to running back Ronnie Brown (with a failed PAT), but the Ravens would pull away as quarterback Joe Flacco got a 5-yard touchdown run.

With the loss, Miami's impressive turnaround season ended with an overall record of 11–6.

Despite having only 16 turnovers throughout the entire regular season, the Dolphins committed 5 turnovers (4 interceptions and a lost fumble).

References

External links

 Miami Dolphins Official Website
 2008 Miami Dolphins at Pro-Football-Reference
 2008 Regular Season Statistics
 2008 Schedule & Results

Miami
Miami Dolphins seasons
AFC East championship seasons
Miami Dolphins